Ralf Stephan Klessen (born 18 February 1968) is a German astronomer. He is a professor of theoretical astrophysics at the Institute of Theoretical Astrophysics, part of the Center for Astronomy at the University of Heidelberg, Germany, and
is currently the Managing Director of the Institute, as well as a Deputy Director of the Center for Astronomy.

He is an expert in the areas of star formation and dwarf galaxies.

In 2002, he was winner of the Ludwig Biermann Award of the German Astronomical Society in recognition of his work on star formation in turbulent gas.

References

External links
 List of Biermann Award winners
 Ralf Klessen's home page

21st-century German astronomers
Ludwig Biermann Award winners
Living people
1968 births